Henry Pratt Fairchild (August 18, 1880 – October 2, 1956) was a distinguished American sociologist who was actively involved in many of the controversial issues of his time. He wrote about race relations, abortion and contraception, and immigration. He was involved with the founding of Planned Parenthood and served as President to the American Eugenics Society.

Early life
Fairchild was born in Dundee, Illinois.  His father was Arthur Babbitt Fairchild, a descendant of Thomas Fairchild, who settled in New England in 1639. His mother a member of the Pratt industrialist family. Henry Fairchild was his grandfather. Fred Rogers Fairchild, who became an economist and educator, was his brother.

Fairchild grew up in Crete, Nebraska, where his father was professor at Doane College. Fairchild attended Doane (AB, 1900) and  Yale University (PhD, 1909). He also received an honorary LL.D. from Doane in 1930.

Organizer and professor
Fairchild was president of the Population Association of America from 1931 to 1935(?). He was president of the American Sociological Society in 1936.

He was active with Margaret Sanger in founding Planned Parenthood.

Fairchild's major teaching appointment was at New York University. He served for 26 years, from 1919 to his retirement in 1945, and became chairman of the Department of Sociology in the Graduate School. Much of his work focused on race, nationalism, immigration, and ethnic conflict.

See also
 Eugenics in the United States
 Fairchild family

References

External links
 
"Henry P. Fairchild" biography at the American Sociological Society Website.
 Henry Pratt Fairchild. Immigration: World Movement and its American Significance. New York:  Macmillan, c1913.
 

1880 births
1956 deaths
20th-century American educators
American sociologists
Henry Pratt
Doane University alumni
People from West Dundee, Illinois